Panzer-Jagd is a 1983 video game published by The Avalon Hill Game Company for the Atari 8-bit family and Commodore 64.

Gameplay
Panzer-Jagd is a game in which the player controls the German commander against the computer controlling the Russian leader, in the middle of World War II in a game of tactical combat.

Reception
Jeff Seiken reviewed the game for Computer Gaming World, and stated that "As the game stands now, Panzer-Jagd simulates tactical combat about as well as Electronic Battleship portrays naval warfare. Gamers interested in tactical warfare would be better advised to spend an additional $10 or AH's TAC for SSI's Combat Leader."

Reviews
Computer Gaming World - Dec, 1991

References

External links
Review in ST.Game
Review in Computer Fun
Review in Antic
Review in Commodore Power/Play
Review in GAMES Magazine
Article in VideoGames & Computer Entertainment

1983 video games
Atari 8-bit family games
Avalon Hill video games
Commodore 64 games
Computer wargames
Turn-based strategy video games
Video games about Nazi Germany
Video games developed in the United States
Video games set in Europe
World War II video games